KCSM may refer to:

 KCSM (FM), a radio station (91.1 FM) licensed to San Mateo, California, United States
 KPJK, a television station (channel 43) licensed to San Mateo, California, United States, which used the call sign KCSM-TV from 1964 to 2018
 Kansas City Southern de México, formerly Grupo Transportación Ferroviaria Mexicana, a Mexican railroad subsidiary of Kansas City Southern